Liv Holmefjord (born 1962) is a Norwegian economist and civil servant. She was appointed head of the Norwegian Directorate of Fisheries from 2008, succeeding Peter Gullestad.

References

External links 
Liv Holmefjord at the Norwegian Centre for Research Data

1962 births
Living people
Norwegian School of Economics alumni
Norwegian civil servants
Directors of government agencies of Norway